In telecommunications, guard intervals are used to ensure that distinct transmissions do not interfere with one another, or otherwise cause overlapping transmissions. These transmissions may belong to different users (as in TDMA) or to the same user (as in OFDM).

The purpose of the guard interval is to introduce immunity to propagation delays, echoes and reflections, to which digital data is normally very sensitive.

Use in digital communications systems 
In OFDM, the beginning of each symbol is preceded by a guard interval. As long as the echoes fall within this interval, they will not affect the receiver's ability to safely decode the actual data, as data is only interpreted outside the guard interval.

In TDMA, each user's timeslot ends with a guard interval. Thus, the guard interval protects against data loss within the same timeslot, and protects the following user's timeslot from interference caused by propagation delay. It is a common misconception that TDMA timeslots begin with the guard interval, as with OFDM. However, in specifications for TDMA systems such as GSM, the guard period is defined as being at the end of the timeslot.

Longer guard periods allow more distant echoes to be tolerated but reduce channel efficiency. For example, in DVB-T, guard intervals are available as 1/32, 1/16, 1/8 or 1/4 of a symbol period. The shortest interval (1/32) provides the lowest protection and the highest data rate; the longest interval (1/4) provides the highest protection but the lowest data rate. Ideally, the guard interval is set to just above the delay spread of the channel.

802.11 guard interval 
To increase data rate, 802.11n added optional support for a  guard interval. This provides an 11% increase in data rate.

The shorter guard interval results in a higher packet error rate when the delay spread of the channel exceed the guard interval and/or if timing synchronization between the transmitter and receiver is not precise.  A scheme could be developed to work out whether a short guard interval would be of benefit to a particular link.  To reduce complexity, manufacturers typically only implement a short guard interval as a final rate adaptation step when the device is running at its highest data rate.

See also 
 Interpacket gap
 Cyclic prefix
 Intersymbol interference

References

External links 
 Technical Standard GSM 05.05 Radio Transmission and Reception. Contains descriptions and diagrams of the GSM use of TDMA timeslots, bursts, and guard periods.
 Guard interval and ISI-free OFDM transmission. Online experiment illustrates ISI-free OFDM transmission if guard time is longer or equal to the channel's maximum delay spread.

Multiplexing